The Perfect Fool is an opera in one act with music and libretto by the English composer Gustav Holst. Holst composed the work over the period of 1918 to 1922. The opera received its premiere at the Covent Garden Theatre, London, on 14 May 1923. Holst had originally asked Clifford Bax to write the libretto, but Bax declined.

In the score, Holst pokes fun at the works of Verdi, Wagner's Parsifal and Debussy. In the opera, the part of the Fool consists of no singing and only one spoken word ("No"). One interpretation of the possible symbolism of the opera, from Donald Tovey, is that the Princess symbolizes the world of opera and the Fool represents the British public.

The opera was not a success, and audiences found the story confusing. Although the opera did receive a live BBC broadcast a year after its premiere, performed by the British National Opera Company and relayed from His Majesty's Theatre, London, revivals of the work have been rare. In 1995, Vernon Handley conducted a performance of the complete opera for the BBC, broadcast on 25 December.

Ballet music

The introductory ballet music is much more often performed, separately as a suite. The ballet music falls into the following sections:
 Andante (invocation)
 Dance of Spirits of Earth (Moderato – Andante)
 Dance of Spirits of Water (Allegro)
 Dance of Spirits of Fire (Allegro moderato – Andante)
Themes from the ballet music recur throughout the remainder of the opera.

Roles

Instrumentation
Woodwind: piccolo, 2 flutes, 2 oboes, english horn, 2 clarinets, bass clarinet, 2 bassoons and a contrabassoon
Brass: 4 horns in F, 4 trumpets in C, 3 trombones (2 tenor and 1 bass) and a tuba
Keyboards: a celesta
Percussion: 3 timpani, a bass drum, cymbals (suspended and clash), a tam-tam, sleigh bells, a tambourine and a xylophone.
Strings: a harp, 1st and 2nd violins, violas, violoncellos, and double basses

References
Notes

Sources
Holmes, Paul, Holst. Omnibus Press, 1998

Further reading
Holden, Amanda (Ed.), The New Penguin Opera Guide, New York: Penguin Putnam, 2001.

External links
 The Perfect Fool – three selections from the opera
 Chester Novello page on The Perfect Fool

Operas by Gustav Holst
One-act operas
1923 operas
Opera world premieres at the Royal Opera House
Operas